C-Man is a 1949 American film noir directed by Joseph Lerner featuring Dean Jagger, John Carradine, Lottie Elwen and Rene Paul. Gail Kubik based his Pulitzer Prize winning Symphony Concertante on his score for C-Man.

Plot
U.S. Customs Department Agent Cliff Holden's (Dean Jagger) childhood best friend and boss is murdered while chasing down jewel thieves.  He's assigned to find the thieves and solve the murder.  The plan is for him to fly to Europe, then catch the same return flight suspect Matty Royal (Rene Paul) will be taking.

Cast
 Dean Jagger as Cliff Holden, alias William Harrah
 John Carradine as Doc Spencer
 Lottie Elwen as Kathe van Bourne
 Rene Paul as Matty Royal
 Walter Vaughan as Customs Inspector Brandon
 Adelaide Klein as Minnie Hoffman
 Edith Atwater as Lydia Brundage
 Harry Landers as Owney Shor
 Jean Ellyn as Birdie Alton
 Walter Brooke as Joe

Reception

Critical response
The film critic for The New York Times, panned the film when it was first released, writing, "According to yesterday's newcomer at the Rialto, C-Man, the Treasury Department's typical customs agent is a suave, amiable sleuth who takes knives, pistols and slugging in stride and roguishly admits that it's all in a day's work. Well and good, but we'll wager that most C-Men are a lot smarter than Dean Jagger ... Miss Elwen and newcomer Harry Landers, a juvenile Richard Widmark, try hard, but most of the actors perk up only at the prospect of another chase. And in view of the material they had to work with, the Treasury Department will probably forgive them."

Recently, film critic Dennis Schwartz gave the film a mixed review.  He wrote, "A lively crime fighting programmer featuring a Custom Agent tracking down a jewel thief and a murderer. It was good on the action part, but there was not much brain-work put into the story and no feel for the characters. It was a routine B-film done on a modest budget in a quasi-documentary style and in a flat black-and-white tone, with nothing much to recommend it except for its atmospheric treatment of New York City and by using authentic locations ... The film didn't make much sense, but it was watchable."

See also
 List of films in the public domain in the United States

References

External links
 
 
 
 
 C-Man informational site and DVD review at DVD Beaver (includes images)
  (public domain)

1949 films
1949 crime films
American crime films
American black-and-white films
Film noir
Film Classics films
1940s English-language films
1940s American films